Amal Hassan is a Nigerian technology entrepreneur and chief executive officer at Outsource global providing outsourcing destinations which she started in 2013. In 2018, she was one of 16 women business leaders named among the 2018 Fortune-US Department of State Global Women’s Mentoring Partnership and regarded as a role model for the girl-child in northern Nigeria.

References 

Living people
Date of birth missing (living people)
Year of birth missing (living people)
Nigerian chief executives
Nigerian businesspeople
21st-century Nigerian businesspeople
Nigerian company founders